Count Arthur Strong's Radio Show! is a sitcom broadcast on BBC Radio 4, written by Steve Delaney. It features Count Arthur Strong, a former variety star who has malapropisms, memory loss and other similar problems, played by Delaney. Each episode follows the Count in his daily business and causing confusion in almost every situation. First broadcast on 23 December 2005, Count Arthur Strong's Radio Show! has had eight series and four specials. In 2009 the show won the Gold Sony Radio Academy Award for comedy, the highest honour for a British radio comedy. A television adaptation, Count Arthur Strong, premiered on BBC Two in July 2013.

History 

The first three series of the show were recorded live at Komedia in Brighton. The fourth series was recorded at the Dancehouse Theatre, Manchester, Komedia Bath and Komedia Brighton. A special was recorded in Edinburgh during the 2008 Edinburgh Festival Fringe. It is jointly made by two production companies: Komedia Entertainment and Smooth Operations.

Characters

Count Arthur Strong 

Count Arthur Strong is a former variety star living in the North of England. The Count, now in his old age, has delusions of grandeur. He has selective memory loss, never hearing what he doesn't want to and malapropism-itis, which result in his confusing anyone he happens to be talking to and even confusing himself. However, he more often than not blames the people he is talking to for causing the confusion in the first place.

A typical conversation for the Count will involve his confusing both himself and others, while becoming drastically sidetracked from the matter in hand. He is usually oblivious to the chaos he causes, often blaming his interlocutors for any confusion. On the rare occasions he realises he is at fault, he often attempts to divert the blame by lying. Inevitably becoming confused by his own lies, his last resort is usually to claim he was recording a stunt for a hidden camera show.
The Count does very rarely encounter frustrating situations which are not his fault such as doing a cooking show and only being brought products that were prepared in packets however he tends to simply complain in these circumstances before making matters worse than they were to start with. 
He has a misguided belief in his ability to hold his drink, and has often performed on stage or live TV/radio when drunk (or occasionally, concussed, with similar effects). He will often go to great lengths to get as drunk as he can as cheaply as he can.

The list of TV shows in which Count Arthur claims to have appeared is remarkably similar to Delaney's own career. However, the one role that Count Arthur speaks about wherever possible, is what he calls the "Bridge Up The River Kwai", where he claims to have appeared alongside Alec Guinness, apparently resenting the fact that Guinness got the part instead of him, although he does point out that he took over the role for the musical version. He also seems resentful that Sean Connery beat him to the lead role in Doctor No, the title of which he often confuses with either Doctor Who or Doctor Dolittle. He has had roles, or at least sat in a car, in numerous TV series and films, such as Juliet Bravo and of course "The Man Who Had Some Shoes."

The Count believes himself to be an expert on Egyptology, leading to the show "Count Arthur Strong's Forgotten Egypt". This stems from his army days when he toured Egypt as part of the cast of what he calls Piddler on the Roof.

He claims to have many show business friends although, apart from Guinness, this seems limited to brief conversations with Anita Harris and Jimmy Clitheroe. He also appears to have a mixed relationship with Edward Woodward. While resenting Woodward's success, he also claims that his advice meant that "for the first time in years, Edward Woodward can cross his legs when he sits down". Woodward's name causes the Count many problems, calling him "Edward Woodwardward", "Edward Woodwind", "Edward Woodbine", "Wedward Goodwood", at one point saying, "In my game, you’ve got to be available 25-7, 380 degrees of the year – that’s why Edward Woodworm’s getting so much work!" etc.

Malcolm Titter 
In some of his stage shows, and in an episode per radio series, the Count has been joined by his protégé, Malcolm Titter (stage name Malcolm de Tinsel). Malcolm is a budding actor and playwright, and goes to the Count for acting lessons. The result is that the naive Malcolm's work is shown to be utterly abysmal.

Other characters 

Other than Count Arthur, there are other regular characters in the series played by Alastair Kerr, Dave Mounfield, Joanna Neary (series one), Sue Perkins (series two and three and the first two specials) and Mel Giedroyc (since series four). These characters include Arthur's butcher Wilf Taylor; cafe owner Gerry; Geoffrey the church hall caretaker; female friend Sally; and Malcolm Titter played by Terry Kilkelly, a student actor for whom Arthur acts as teacher. Other guest appearances have been made by Barry Cryer, a showbiz colleague of Arthur's, Kate Van Dike played the dying mother of Arthur in The Musical in series 5 and the stage show of the same name, Martin Marquez in shows 4 and 5 of series 7, and Peter Serafinowicz who appears in series 7, Episode 1: 'The Minx' voicing Terry Wogan.

Episodes 
Episode information from BBC website, Episodes

Series 1

2006 Special

Series 2

Series 3

2008 Special

Series 4

Series 5

Series 6

Series 7

2014 Special

2015 Special

Series 8

2017 Special

2018 Special

2019 Special

2020 Special

2021 Special

Mint Extracts 

On 11 June 2011, the recently relaunched radio station BBC Radio 4 Extra broadcast a three-hour special, Extra Strong - Count Arthur Speaks! Mint Extracts, embodying classic episodes of the first six series linked by exclusive new material featuring the Count in conversation with the show's producer Mark Radcliffe. It has since been repeated several times.

Television Series

The character of Count Arthur Strong was rebooted by Steve Delaney and a new co-writer Graham Linehan with the 2013 BBC sitcom Count Arthur Strong which was broadcast for six half-hour weekly episodes from 8 July 2013. The television project heralds a new chapter in the life of Count Arthur Strong; the series is set in London rather than Doncaster (although neither made frequent reference to their real-world setting). None of the supporting characters from the radio programme are featured, although subtle background references are made to the radio characters (Wilf's butcher's shop appears in the background of a shot, for example). Two further series have since been broadcast, although in 2017 the BBC announced that it would not be commissioning further series.

Honours
In 2009, Count Arthur Strong's Radio Show! won the Gold Sony Radio Academy Award in comedy.

In 2016, Count Arthur Strong's Radio Show! won the Best Radio Sitcom from the British Comedy Guide.

References

External links

BBC Radio comedy programmes
BBC Radio 4 programmes
2005 radio programme debuts